Aldania thisbe is a butterfly in the family Nymphalidae. It is found in the Amur and Ussuri regions of Russia, central and north-eastern China and Korea. The habitat consists of open landscapes and forest canopy in broadleaved or mixed forests with a mixture of oak.

Adults are on wing from June to July.

The larvae feed on Quercus mongolica.

Subspecies
Aldania thisbe thisbe
Aldania thisbe obscurior (Oberthür, 1906)
Aldania thisbe dilutior (Oberthür, 1906)

References

Butterflies described in 1859
Limenitidinae